The Bibi-Heybat Mosque is a historical mosque in Baku, Azerbaijan. The existing structure, built in the 1990s, is a recreation of the mosque with the same name built in the 13th century by Shirvanshah Farrukhzad II Ibn Ahsitan II, which was completely destroyed by the Bolsheviks in 1936.

The Bibi-Heybat Mosque includes the tomb of Ukeyma Khanum (a descendant of The Islamic Prophet Muhammad), and today is the spiritual center for the Muslims of the region and one of the major monuments of Islamic architecture in Azerbaijan.

It is locally known as "the mosque of Fatima", which is what Alexandre Dumas called it when he described the mosque during his visit in the 1850s.

History
The mosque was built over the tomb of the daughter of the seventh Shiite Imam - Musa al-Kadhim, who fled to Baku from persecution of Abbasid caliphs. On the tomb there is carved on a stone inscription indicating that Ukeyma Khanum belongs to the sacred family: "Here was buried Ukeyma Khanum, a descendant of the Prophet Muhammad, the granddaughter of the sixth Imam Ja'far al-Sadiq, the daughter of the Seventh Imam Musa al-Kadhim, sister of the eighth Imam Ali al-Ridha".

Based on the writings on the south wall of a mosque, historians attribute the construction by the end of the 13th century. Arabic inscription on the mosque wall reads: "The work Mahmud ibn Sa'd", which is the same architect who built the Nardaran Fortress near Baku.

Haji Sheikh Sharif was among many Muslims who is buried near the mosque.  He arrived in Baku to spread Sufism, and spent the rest of his life in this mosque.

Famous French writer, Alexandre Dumas, who visited the mosque in the 1840s, in his book "The World" wrote: The mosque - a place of worship for infertile women, they come here on foot, worship, and within a year gain the ability to give birth.

The mention of the mosque is also found in the works of local and European explorers and travelers, such as the Abbasgulu Bakikhanov, Ilya Berezin, Johannes Albrecht Bernhard Dorn, Nicholas Khanykov and Yevgeni Pakhomov.

In 1911, the patron of Baku, Alasgar Agha Dadashov with architect Haji Najaf constructed a new building of the mosque. Also, the reconstruction of the tomb and the old mosque took a cubic form.

The destruction of the mosque

After the establishment of Soviet power in Azerbaijan in 1920, the Bolsheviks began lashing out against religion. Bibi-Heybat Mosque, along with the Baku's Russian Orthodox Alexander Nevsky Cathedral and the Roman Catholic Church of the Immaculate Conception became a target for the new regime. The mosque was blown up in 1934 as result of the Soviet anti-religious campaign.

Only after the destruction of the mosque, in the same year in Moscow, Soviet government decided on conservation of architectural monuments of historical significance, while chairman of Azkomstarisa Salamov sentenced to 20 years exile in Siberia for the destruction of the mosque.

Restoration of the mosque
In 1994, after Azerbaijan gained its independence, then president Heydar Aliyev ordered the construction of a new building for Bibi-Heybat Mosque at the same place where it was destroyed. The layout and size of the complex were restored in 1980 on the basis of photographs taken shortly before the explosion. The records of various travellers, including the important role played by a small article by G. Sadig, written in 1925, which described the condition of the mosque compound in the mid 1920s also played key part in restoration of the mosque.

A dedication ceremony, attended by President Heydar Aliyev, was held on July 11, 1997. In May 1999, the inauguration of the new mosque was held, while a monument to Shirvanshakh Farruhzade and Heydar Aliyev were unveiled in 2008.

The mosque was reconstructed and enlarged by the Presidential decree in 2005. New halls have been constructed to insure the convenience of pilgrims.

Architecture

The old mosque was situated in the southern part of the tomb, while there was a  minaret in the west part of the mosque. Later a crypt and two niches were added to the mosque to the south of the minaret. On the niches there were inscriptions containing the name of Fatali Khan, whose tombstone marble slab is now in the Azerbaijan State Museum of History.

From 1305 to 1313, Mahmud ibn Sa'd built the mosque's minarets. The top of the thread and stalactites, raised by a small pillar, surmounted by a semicircular dome of Rebrov. Railing minarets were patterned with stone grill. Graphic studies showed that the height of the minaret was about 22 m.

The rich interior of the complex was decorated with ornaments. The inside of mosque included an oblong rectangular room with a lancet arch. Under the dome, there were chandelier-candlestick, and a hook on which it hung was surrounded by stained glass.

On the north side of the minaret and the mosque immediately adjoining the tomb, there was an inscription which was discovered by Johannes Albrecht Bernhard Dorn. From the inscription it was clear that this mausoleum was built in 1619 and interred here by Sheikh Sharif Sheikh Bin Abid, who died the next day after work.

Architecture of the restored mosque
The modern restored mosque is a classic example of the Shirvan architectural school. The mosque has three domes, which have kept the traditional corrugated galvanised iron shape of the old mosque and two minarets. The domes are decorated with the green and turquoise mirrors, which are bordered with gilded inscriptions from Qur'an. The men's praying room is located on the south side of the complex, while women - on the north side. Between them is the mausoleum.

The builders used local varieties of limestone such as Gulbaht. On the inside the walls of marble carvings with calligraphic inscriptions such as muhaggah, Suls, Jami-Suls, Kufic, kufi-shatrandzh, musalsag, sofa and tugra. Also widely used such ornamental compositions as islimi, shukyufa, Bandy-Rumi, zendzhiri Selcuk (Seljuk chain), Shamsi, Jafari and Achma-yumma.

The mosque was designed by Azerbaijani architect Sanan Sultanov.

Gallery

References 

Mosques completed in 1997
Mosques in Baku
Demolished buildings and structures in Azerbaijan
Buildings and structures demolished in 1936